North Adelaide was an electoral district of the House of Assembly in the Australian state of South Australia from 1875 to 1902 and again from 1915 to 1938.

North Adelaide was also the name of an electoral district of the unicameral South Australian Legislative Council from 1851 until its abolition in 1857, John Bentham Neales being the elected member.

The North Adelaide area is currently fairly safe to safe Liberal and is represented in the seat of Adelaide.

Members

References 

Former electoral districts of South Australia
1875 establishments in Australia
1902 disestablishments in Australia
1915 establishments in Australia
1938 disestablishments in Australia
North Adelaide